Menippe rumphii is a species of stone crab. It can be found in the Pacific Ocean from Taiwan to Indonesia.

External links

Eriphioidea
Crustaceans described in 1798